Give Me Time is an album of home recordings by the American blues musician Magic Sam, recorded at his house in Chicago in 1968, that was released by the Delmark label in 1991.

Reception

AllMusic reviewer Lindsay Planer wrote:

The Penguin Guide to Blues Recordings said "He confines his guitar work to chords and riffs but doesn't stint when a song requires his full voice. Sound quality is acceptable but by the nature this is a record supplementary to the requirements for all but the dedicated collector".

Track listing
All compositions by Magic Sam except where noted
 "Give Me Time" – 3:28
 "You Belong to Me" – 3:49
 "That's Why I'm Crying" – 3:25
 "You're So Fine" – 2:55
 "Come into My Arms" – 1:55
 "I Can't Quit You Baby" (Willie Dixon) – 3:54
 "Sweet Little Angel" (Unknown) – 3:14
 "That's All I Need" – 1:50
 "What Have I Done Wrong?" – 4:37
 "Baby, You Torture My Soul" – 3:44
 "I'm So Glad" (Skip James) – 2:18
 "Shake a Hand" – 2:56

Personnel
Magic Sam − guitar, vocals
Eddie Boyd – vocals (track 5)

References

Delmark Records albums
1991 albums
Magic Sam albums
Albums produced by Bob Koester